Joseph Wilbur Dorsey (1864 - January 31, 1913) is a former major league pitcher and outfielder for the Baltimore Monumentals.

He played his one and only major league game on July 9, 1884. He started that game as a pitcher. However, after giving up 8 runs (only 4 earned though) in 4 innings he was switched to the outfield. He finished the game with the loss and 0-for-3 at the plate.

References

External links

1864 births
1913 deaths
Albany (minor league baseball) players
Baltimore Monumentals players
Major League Baseball pitchers
Rockford White Stockings players
Washington Nationals (minor league) players
Trenton Trentonians players
Terre Haute (minor league baseball) players
Scranton Indians players
Richmond (minor league baseball) players
Lynchburg (minor league baseball) players
19th-century baseball players
Baseball players from Baltimore
Burials at the Cemetery of the Evergreens